Noel Gerard Ward (born 8 December 1952) is a Northern Irish former footballer who played as a defender.

Born in Donemana, County Tyrone, Ward started his career at Derry City, helping the club reach the final of the 1970–71 Irish Cup, but were ultimately defeated 3-0 by Distillery. Following Derry's withdrawal from the Irish league, Ward moved to Portadown in 1972. He played in the 1972–73 Gold Cup final, which Portadown lost 2–0 against Linfield.

Ward joined Aberdeen in 1974, but made only seven first team appearances in two seasons for the club. He signed for Wigan Athletic in 1976, making over 100 appearances for the club, and helping Wigan gain election to the Football League in 1978. In 1979, Ward broke his leg in a match against Portsmouth, an injury which prematurely ended his career. In 1982, he was awarded a testimonial match by Wigan, which was played against Chelsea.

Career statistics

References

External links
Profile at NIFG

1952 births
Living people
People from County Tyrone
Association footballers from Northern Ireland
Association football defenders
Derry City F.C. players
Portadown F.C. players
Aberdeen F.C. players
Wigan Athletic F.C. players
English Football League players
Scottish Football League players